Cyclobacterium amurskyense  is a heterotrophic, aerobic and non-motile bacterium from the genus of Cyclobacterium which has been isolated from sea water.

References

External links
Type strain of Cyclobacterium amurskyense at BacDive -  the Bacterial Diversity Metadatabase

Cytophagia
Bacteria described in 2005